Country Christmas is the eighth solo studio album and first Christmas album by American country music singer-songwriter Loretta Lynn. It was released on October 17, 1966 by Decca Records. Lynn would not release another Christmas album until 2016's White Christmas Blue, fifty years later.

The album includes four original compositions by Lynn, along with popular holiday songs, including "Santa Claus Is Coming to Town", "White Christmas", and "Frosty the Snowman".

In 2005, MCA Records reissued the album on CD as a part of their 20th Century Masters series, under the title The Christmas Collection: The Best of Loretta Lynn, with modified cover art.

Critical reception

In the issue dated October 29, 1966, Billboard published a review of the album, which said, "The album's beautiful songs include "Country Christmas", "Away in a Manger" — all great programming material for country music stations, and this will create high sales. The "Manger" tune deserves a single. Possibly her best effort to date."

Commercial performance 
The album did not appear on any music charts.

The only single, "To Heck with Ole Santa Claus", was released in November 1966 and did not chart.

Recording
Recording sessions for the album took place on July 7, 13, and 15, 1966, at Bradley's Barn in Mount Juliet, Tennessee.

Track listing

Personnel
Adapted from the Decca recording session records.
Harold Bradley – electric bass guitar
Owen Bradley – producer
Fred Carter Jr. – guitar, electric guitar
Jon Corneal – drums
Floyd Cramer – piano
Buddy Harman – drums
Junior Huskey – bass
The Jordanaires – background vocals
Loretta Lynn – lead vocals
Grady Martin – guitar, lead electric guitar
Hal Rugg – steel guitar

References 

1966 Christmas albums
Loretta Lynn albums
Christmas albums by American artists
Albums produced by Owen Bradley
Decca Records albums
Covers albums
Country Christmas albums